"Alone at Last" is a song written by Johnny Lehmann and performed by Jackie Wilson featuring Dick Jacobs and His Orchestra.  It was featured on his 1963 album Sings the World's Greatest Melodies.

Background
The song's melody was adapted from Pyotr Ilyich Tchaikovsky's, Concerto No. 1 in B Flat Minor

Chart performance
"Alone at Last" reached No. 8 on the U.S. pop chart, No. 11 in Australia, No. 20 on the U.S. R&B chart, and No. 50 on the UK Singles Chart in 1960.

References

1960 singles
Jackie Wilson songs
1960 songs
Brunswick Records singles